Aciura is a genus of tephritid  or fruit flies in the family Tephritidae.

Species
Aciura afghana (Hering, 1961) (Synonym: Tephrella afghana Hering, 1961)
Aciura coryli (Rossi, 1794)(Synonyms: Aciura femoralis Robineau-Desvoidy, 1830, Aciura powelli Seguy, 1930, Musca coryli Rossi, 1794)

References

Tephritinae
Tephritidae genera